Mandi Bhalwal is a village near the Pakistan-administered  Azad Kashmir. It is also the last union council of Pakistan.
Population of union council Mandi Bhalwal is about (109) 18960 (According to 98s). Major villages of Union Council Mandi Bhalwal are:

Mandi Bhalwal
Gurrah Burj
Moja
Thill
Dhok Nakka 

The civil hospital is located in village mandi bhalwal. The higher secondary education school is located in village thill. The union council office is located in village dehri near to shakrila town.
Mandi bhalwal is the biggest village of this union council. The major population of the village is chib rajput.
There is govt girls middle school founded by ex president chaudhary Fazal elahi
And co education school named as captain Addalat Khan memorial model founded by Asim hussain in 1998.

Populated places in Bhimber District
Union councils of Bhimber District